Ondigus is a genus of braconid wasps in the family Braconidae. There are at least two described species in Ondigus, found in Mexico and Central America.

Species
These two species belong to the genus Ondigus:
 Ondigus bicolor Braet, Barbalho & van Achterberg, 2003
 Ondigus cuixmalensis Zaldívar-Riverón, Martinez, Ceccarelli & Shaw, 2012

References

Further reading

 

Parasitic wasps